Events from the year 1167 in Ireland.

Incumbents
High King: Ruaidrí Ua Conchobair

Events
August – Diarmait Mac Murchada, exiled King of Leinster, returns from Wales with a force of Flemings under Richard fitz Godbert de Roche of Rhos (the first Anglo-Norman knight to land in Ireland) and retakes control of the Uí Ceinnselaig, presaging the Norman invasion of Ireland, but fails to take Waterford.
Muirchertach Mac Lochlainn, High King of Ireland, presides over an assembly of laity and clergy of Leath Cuinn at Áth Buide Tlachtga (Athboy); marches to Armagh; divides Tír Eoghain between Niall Mac Lochlainn and Áed Ua Néill; and (at about this date) holds an Óenach Tailten.
Completion of Derbforgaill's Nun's Church at Clonmacnoise by Conchobar ua Cellaig, king of the Uí Maine, to replace a wooden oratory.

Deaths
Uada Ua Con Ceanainn, King of Uí Díarmata; he is perhaps succeeded by Cú Ceanain Ó Con Ceanainn.
Toirdelbhach MacDiarmaida Ó Briain, King of Thomond; he is succeeded by his son Muirchertach.
The Barnwells arrived in Ireland with Strongbow in 1167 and had settled in Berehaven in Munster.

References